Anant Jog is an Indian film and television actor who acts in Hindi and Marathi films.

Personal life 
Jog's daughter, Kshitee Jog, is a television actress.

Filmography

Films

Television

References

External links

Male actors in Hindi cinema
Male actors in Marathi cinema
Indian male film actors
Living people
Male actors from Mumbai
21st-century Indian male actors
Year of birth missing (living people)